Anaea troglodyta, the Florida leafwing, Portia or Florida goatweed butterfly, is a butterfly of the family Nymphalidae. It is found in southern Florida and on many islands of the Caribbean. In Jamaica, it is known as the Jamaican tropical leafwing and in the Cayman Islands and Cuba it is known as the Cuban red leaf.

Adults are on wing from October to April (dry-season form) and from May to October (wet-season form).

The larvae feed on Croton cascarilla and Croton linearis. Adults feed on rotting fruit, dung and fluids.

Although over 230 species have been included in the genus Anaea, Gerardo Lamas (2004) considers all Anaea populations to represent a single species, Anaea troglodyta (Fabricius 1775).

Subspecies
Some authors list the following subspecies, while others treat (most) as valid species or even synonyms:
Anaea troglodyta troglodyte
Anaea troglodyta astina (described from St. Thomas)
Anaea troglodyta aidea (Arizona, Mexico to Costa Rica)
Anaea troglodyta andria (Mexico, from Texas to Nebraska and to West Virginia to Georgia and Florida)
Anaea troglodyta cubana (Cuba, Grand Cayman)
Anaea troglodyta borinquenalis (Puerto Rico)
Anaea troglodyta minor (St. Kitts, Antigua, Montserrat, St. Christopher, Guadeloupe)
Anaea troglodyta floridalis (Florida)
Anaea troglodyta portia (Jamaica)

See also
Species problem
Superspecies

References

External links
Bug Guide
Classification

Anaeini
Butterflies of North America
Butterflies described in 1775
Butterflies of Jamaica
Taxa named by Johan Christian Fabricius